Boris Repnin (born 30 August 1962) is a Soviet speed skater. He competed in the men's 1000 metres event at the 1988 Winter Olympics.

References

1962 births
Living people
Soviet male speed skaters
Olympic speed skaters of the Soviet Union
Speed skaters at the 1988 Winter Olympics
Place of birth missing (living people)